Cyril Montana is a French writer and one of Anggun's former husbands. She gave birth to his daughter named Kirana Cipta Montana, on 8 November 2007.

Works 
 Malabar trip, Paris, Éditions Le Dilettante, 2003, 125 p. 
 Carla on my mind, Paris, Éditions Le Dilettante, 2005, 156 p. 
 Le Bonheur de refaire le monde, Paris, Maren Sell Éditeurs, 2005, 158 p. 
 La Faute à Mick Jagger, Paris, Éditions Le Dilettante, 2007, 222 p. 
 Je nous trouve beaux, Paris, Albin Michel, coll. " Littérature générale ", 2013, 200 p.

References

1969 births
French writers
Living people
Anggun